Becknerville, also known as Hayden's Corner after original settler Samuel Hayden, is an unincorporated town in southern Clark County, Kentucky, United States. It is part of the Lexington–Fayette Metropolitan Statistical Area.

References

Unincorporated communities in Clark County, Kentucky
Unincorporated communities in Kentucky
Lexington–Fayette metropolitan area